A sonnet cycle or sonnet sequence is a group of sonnets, arranged to address a particular person or theme, and designed to be read both as a collection of fully realized individual poems and as a single poetic work comprising all the individual sonnets. 

A sonnet cycle may have any theme, but unrequited love is the most common.  The arrangement of the sonnets generally reflects thematic concerns, with chronological arrangements (whether linear, like a progression, or cyclical, like the seasons) being the most common.  A sonnet cycle may also have allegorical or argumentative structures which replace or complement chronology.

While the thematic arrangement may reflect the unfolding of real or fictional events, the sonnet cycle is very rarely narrative; the narrative elements may be inferred, but provide background structure, and are never the primary concern of the poet's art.

Notable sonnet cycles have been written by France Prešeren, Dante Alighieri, Petrarch, Pierre de Ronsard, Edmund Spenser, Rupert Brooke, Sir Philip Sidney, William Shakespeare, John Donne, Justus de Harduwijn, William Wordsworth, Elizabeth Barrett Browning, Hans Irrigmann, Jacques Perk, Rainer Maria Rilke, and Edna St. Vincent Millay.

List of sonnet cycles (sonnet sequences) 
 William Shakespeare: Sonnets (first published 1609)
 Justus de Harduwijn: De Weerliicke Liefden Tot Roose-mond (1613)
 Elizabeth Barrett Browning: Sonnets from the Portuguese (1850)
 George Meredith: Modern Love (1862)
 Dante Gabriel Rossetti: House of Life (1881)
 Jacques Perk: Mathilde, een sonnettenkrans (1882)
 Edna St. Vincent Millay: Sonnets from an Ungrafted Tree (1923)

See also
Crown of sonnets

References

External links
Elizabethan Sonnet Cycles, edited by Martha Foote Crow, covering Phillis, by Thomas Lodge, and Licia, by Giles Fletcher, from Project Gutenberg
Elizabethan Sonnet Cycles, edited by Martha Foote Crow, covering Delia, by Samuel Daniel, and Diana, by Henry Constable, from Project Gutenberg
First edition of Shakespeare's Sonnets (1609), from The British Library
Definition of "sonnet sequence" from "Glossary of Poetic Terms" (Poetry Foundation), with links to sonnets by George Meredith, Sir Philip Sidney, Rupert Brooke, and Elizabeth Barrett Browning

Sonnet studies